Mikko Kristian Lehtonen (born 1 April 1987) is a Finnish professional ice hockey winger currently playing for ESV Kaufbeuren in the DEL2.

Playing career
Lehtonen was drafted by Boston Bruins in the 3rd round (83rd selection) of 2005 NHL Entry Draft. Mikko was drafted from Finnish team, Espoo Blues of the SM-liiga. On 31 May 2007, the Boston Bruins signed Lehtonen to an entry-level contract.

Lehtonen made his North American debut in the 2008–09 season with Boston's American Hockey League affiliate, the Providence Bruins. Lehtonen made his NHL debut in the Bruins penultimate regular season game in a 6-1 defeat to the Buffalo Sabres on 11 April 2009.

While with Skellefteå on 28 February 2011, Lehtonen's NHL rights were traded by the Bruins along with Jeff Penner to the Minnesota Wild in exchange for Anton Khudobin.

On 4 May 2011, Lehtonen was announced as the new player of KHL's Severstal Cherepovets.

Career statistics

Regular season and playoffs

International

References

External links
 

1987 births
Living people
Boston Bruins draft picks
Boston Bruins players
Djurgårdens IF Hockey players
Espoo Blues players
Finnish ice hockey right wingers
Sportspeople from Espoo
HPK players
KHL Medveščak Zagreb players
Providence Bruins players
Skellefteå AIK players
Oulun Kärpät players
Severstal Cherepovets players
ZSC Lions players
SC Bern players
HC Lugano players
Örebro HK players